Tang Kee Chan (17 February 1912 – 2 July 1991) was a Hong Kong actor, singer and radio personality. He is often referred to as the "King of Comedy (諧劇大王)"  which is a moniker given to him by the Hong Kong entertainment industry as evidenced by his profile in the 'Historical Dictionary of Hong Kong Cinema' by Lisa Stokes, Tang's official profile at Avenue of Stars and a radio broadcast titled '60 Years of Broadcasting - The Most Memorable Moments' by Radio Television Hong Kong.

He is known in the radio broadcasting industry for voicing and playing up to eight to nine different roles for his story telling show and also for starring as part of a comedic duo (The Two Fools) with Sun Ma Sze Tsang in a series of films.

Career
Tang had his start in his native Guangdong as a radio broadcaster before travelling to Hong Kong after being recruited by Rediffusion Television. He specialized in comedy and used up to eight to nine different voices and roles in his story telling show titled 'Tang Kee Chan's Comedy Show'. His characters ranged in age from small children to old citizens and included members of both genders.

He branched out into the film industry in 1950 and starred in over 100 films. He also wrote the screen plays for some of the films including "The Feuds between Huang Tangjing and Chen Mengji" in which he co-starred with opera singer, Sun Ma Sze Tsang.

Tang forged a partnership with Sun Ma Sze Tsang and starred with him in a series of films as the comedic duo known as "The Two Fools". Tang played the fool while Sun Ma Sze Tsang played the smarter member of the duo. Their disagreements were often improvised and comedic.

In 1963, Chubby Checker held two concerts in Hong Kong. Under contract with Diamond Records, Tang was asked to perform with Checker. Owing to the language barrier, Diamond Records decided to re-write Pat Boone's Speedy Gonzales where Chubby sung in English while Tang replaced the English spoken parts with Cantonese dialogue. Because of the success seen during the performances, a version of this song was recorded in 1965 with The Fabulous Echoes singing in English while Tang reprised his speaking role in Cantonese.

On 30 May 1963, Patti Page had two performances in Hong Kong to which Tang was a supporting act along with The Fabulous Echoes.

In 1975, he immigrated to Canada and would occasionally travel back to Hong Kong to cameo in films such as Chasing Girls, All the Wrong Clues for the Right Solution, Behind the Yellow Line, Happy Ghost II, and The Isle of Fantasy.

Tang has a plaque at the Avenue of Stars, Hong Kong which honours outstanding contributors to the Hong Kong Film Industry much like the Hollywood Walk of Fame. He is commemorated as number 29.

In 2009, Tang was recognized as one of seventy-three significant contributing members to the Hong Kong Film Industry in a website created by DotAsia and Radio Television Hong Kong which celebrates 100 years of Hong Kong Films.

Music

Tang Kee-chan started recording albums as early as 1956.  Cantonese singers whom he partnered include Cheng Gwan-min (鄭君綿), Cheng Pik Ying (鄭碧影), Cheng Kwok Bo (鄭幗寶), Law Lai Kuen (罗丽娟), Lam Dan (林丹), Lee Bo-Ying (李寶瑩) and Ng May Ying (吳美英).  His songs are mainly the humorous type.

Personal life

He had five children, none of whom followed in their father's footsteps into the entertainment industry. Third son, Professor Tang Siu Wa (鄧兆華) was a Professor and Chairman of Psychiatry at the University of California, Irvine and later, Chair Professor at the Department of Psychiatry in the University of Hong Kong Medical School before his retirement in 2008.

In 1991, Tang died from emphysema in Los Angeles, California, at the age of 79. As most of his descendants reside in Toronto, Canada, he was flown there for his funeral rites and subsequent burial.

Filmography

Film

Writer

Producer

External links 
 
 
 Tang Kee Chan at Hong Kong Cinemagic

References 

1912 births
1991 deaths
Hong Kong male actors
Hong Kong male singers
Hong Kong radio presenters
Male actors from Guangdong
Singers from Guangdong
20th-century Chinese male singers
Chinese emigrants to Canada